Mike De Palmer and Peter Doohan were the defending champions, but did not participate this year.

Bob Green and Wally Masur won the title, defeating Sammy Giammalva Jr. and Greg Holmes 5–7, 6–4, 6–4 in the final.

Seeds

Draw

Draw

References
Draw

1986 Livingston Open
1986 Grand Prix (tennis)